Corporation MRT station is a future elevated Mass Rapid Transit (MRT) station on the Jurong Region line in Jurong West, Singapore.

History
On 9 May 2018, LTA announced that Corporation station would be part of the proposed Jurong Region line (JRL). The station will be constructed as part of Phase 1, JRL (West), consisting of 10 stations between Choa Chu Kang, Boon Lay and Tawas, and is expected to be completed in 2027.

Contract J103 for the design and construction of Corporation Station and associated viaducts was awarded to Eng Lee Engineering Pte Ltd - Wai Fong Construction Pte Ltd Joint Venture (JV) at a sum of S$274.3 million. Construction will start in 2020, with completion in 2027. Contract J103 also includes the design and construction of Hong Kah station, and associated viaducts.

Initially expected to open in 2026, the restrictions on the construction due to the COVID-19 pandemic has led to delays in the JRL line completion, and the date was pushed to 2027.

Location
The station will be straddled over the existing Jurong West Avenue 2, just east of the junction with Bulim Avenue and Corporation Road, and west of the PIE expressway exit. It is located within the Jurong West planning area between the Hong Kah and Wenya Subzones, with a housing estate and the future site of Jurong Pioneer Junior College to the south, and the Bulim district of the future Jurong Innovation District to the north.

Access to the station will be via 4 exits, 2 of each side of Jurong West Avenue 2.

References

Mass Rapid Transit (Singapore) stations
Proposed railway stations in Singapore
Railway stations scheduled to open in 2027